is a 1991 Japanese animated science fiction action thriller film directed by Hiroyuki Kitakubo and written by Katsuhiro Otomo. The animation for Roujin Z was produced by A.P.P.P. in association with other companies including Movic, Sony Music Entertainment Japan, Aniplex and TV Asahi.

Plot
Roujin Z is set in early 21st-century Japan. A group of scientists and hospital administrators, under the direction of the Ministry of Public Welfare, have developed the Z-001: a computerized hospital bed with robotic features. The Z-001 takes complete care of the patient: it can dispense food and medicine, remove excretory waste, bathe and exercise the patient lying within its frame. The bed is driven by its own built-in nuclear power reactor—and in the event of an atomic meltdown, the bed (including the patient lying within) would become automatically sealed in concrete.

The first patient to be "volunteered" to test the bed is an 87-year-old dying widower named Kijuro Takazawa. He is an invalid who is cared for by a young nursing student named Haruko. The electronic elements within the Z-001 somehow manage to transcribe Takazawa's thoughts through Haruko's office computer, and he uses the communication to cry for help. Although she objects to such treatment of elderly patients, Haruko begrudgingly seeks the aid of a group of computer hackers in the hospital's geriatric ward to create and install a vocal simulation of Takazawa's deceased wife in the Z-001. However, once Takazawa wishes to go to the beach, the Z-001 detaches itself from its moorings and escapes from the hospital with the man in its grasp. Haruko's fears are then justified, as it is discovered that the bed is actually a government-designed, experimental weapons robot.

Cast

Themes
In his review of Rojin Z, Tony Rayns stated the film focuses on three primary issues: health care for the elderly, the stand-off between traditional values and modern technology and the Right's covert plans to re-militarise Japan.

Production
The animation for Roujin Z was produced by A.P.P.P. in association with other companies including Movic, Sony Music Entertainment Japan, Aniplex and TV Asahi. The film was directed by Hiroyuki Kitakubo, who previously directed the "A Tale of Two Robots" segment in the APPP anthology film Robot Carnival. Katsuhiro Otomo provided the film's story and screenplay. The characters were designed by Hisashi Eguchi, the manga artist known for Stop!! Hibari-kun!. He used his now current wife as a model for Haruko. Eguchi also played part in some of the film's animation, such as its smoke effects, alongside key animator Takeshi Honda. Both Otomo and Mitsuo Iso were responsible for the mechanical designs. Satoshi Kon acted as the film's art director and set designer. Kon previously wrote the script for Otomo's live-action black comedy World Apartment Horror, though Roujin Z was the first anime on which Kon worked. Otomo opted to not direct the film, as he was more eager to work on World Apartment Horror. The musical score was composed by Bun Itakura. Anime localization pioneer Carl Macek was the film's sound design producer. The closing song  is performed by Mishio Ogawa.

Soundtrack

Release and marketing
Roujin Z premiered theatrically in Japan on September 14, 1991. An English-dubbed version was directed by Michael Bakewell with a script adaptation by George Roubicek. The dub was produced by Manga Entertainment UK (a joint venture of Central Park Media and PolyGram Filmed Entertainment) in 1994, and was licensed by Kit Parker Films with a PG-13 rating in the United States. The film debuted in the US at an international film festival in Fort Lauderdale during November 1994. It was screened in more than 30 cities in the country such as New York City's Angelika Film Center on January 5, 1996. Manga Entertainment marketed the film in English-speaking regions as being "by the creator of Akira".

Roujin Z first saw VHS and Laserdisc releases in Japan in 1991, in Great Britain, Europe and Australia in 1994, in North America in 1995, and its first Japanese DVD release on August 21, 1999. An "HD Master Edition" DVD was released in the region on April 13, 2005. The English dub was initially released on VHS by Manga Entertainment in the United Kingdom, Australia, and New Zealand in 1994. Image Entertainment distributed the English version on DVD in the US on August 26, 1998. Central Park Media re-released the movie on DVD on April 9, 2002, then again on April 27, 2004 under the US Manga Corps label. The home video version is currently out-of-print in the US. The film has also been broadcast on numerous television networks worldwide, including the Sci-Fi Channel, ImaginAsian, the International Channel, and the Funimation Channel in the United States.

The Roujin Z Original Soundtrack was made available for sale in Japan by Epic Records on November 21, 1991. Roujin Z was adapted into a manga titled , featuring the story by Otomo and illustrated by Tai Okada. It was originally serialized in the Kodansha publication Mr. Magazine from March to December 1991. A single tankōbon bound volume was published in Japan on December 12, 1991. No official English version exists, but Glénat published a French edition on January 22, 1997.

Manga Entertainment UK re-released Roujin Z on Blu-ray in June 2012 in conjunction with Kazé UK, the European subsidiary of Viz Media as they hold the rights to the English dub, which they produced in-house in 1994.

Reception
From contemporary reviews, Roujin Z won the Mainichi Film Award for animation in 1991. From Western critics, Stephen Holden of The New York Times called it an "amusing futuristic morality tale," noting how it "takes sharp digs at yuppie medical students who welcome a device that will enable them to discard their aging parents and concentrate on their careers." Joey O'Bryan, reviewing Roujin Z for The Austin Chronicle, called the film "briskly paced, intelligent, exciting, and darkly funny." Roger Ebert, writing in the Chicago Sun-Times, observed: "I cannot imagine this story being told in a conventional movie. Not only would the machine be impossibly expensive and complex to create with special effects, but the social criticism would be immediately blue-penciled by Hollywood executives." Tony Rayns (Sight & Sound) felt the film was "engaging entertainment, not least because it so resolutely counters the expectations of the adolescent males who made up the core audience for Akira." Rayns also noted that "the only real let down in the film was the character design of Haruko", finding her to be "the round-eyed moppet of the type seen everywhere in Japanese schlock made-for-video animation"

From retrospective reviews, Helen McCarthy in 500 Essential Anime Movies called Roujin Z a "gripping movie - an action thriller whose star is even older than Bruce Willis". She stated that it is a "funny film that will keep you entertained and make you think", noting that it is also "one of the most original anime you'll ever see". In 2001, Wizard Entertainment listed the film at number 42 of its top 50 anime to be released in North America. The publisher's magazine Anime Insider listed Roujin Z as the seventh-best anime comedy in its January 2004 issue.

See also 

 List of Japanese films of 1991

References

External links
 
 
 Entry in The Encyclopedia of Science Fiction

1990s science fiction films
1991 anime films
1991 manga
Action anime and manga
Animated action films
Animated thriller films
Aniplex
Central Park Media
Films set in the United States
Japanese action thriller films
Japanese animated science fiction films
Japanese science fiction action films
Katsuhiro Otomo
Medical-themed films
Thriller anime and manga
Films directed by Hiroyuki Kitakubo
1990s American films